E. J. Hill may refer to:

EJ Hill (born 1985), American artist
Ellsworth Jerome Hill (1833–1917), an American botanist active in the Chicago region whose standard author abbreviation is E.J.Hill
Ernest Joseph Hill (1985-), known as EJ Hill, a contemporary American artist from Los Angeles